Ayumi Hamasaki Countdown Live 2010–2011 A: Do It Again is Japanese pop singer Ayumi Hamasaki's 10th Countdown concert DVD
.

Track list

 Snowfield
 Last Angel
 Duty
 Is This Love?
 Marionette -prelude-
 Marionette
 Free & Easy
 Endless Sorrow
 Dearest ~ Heaven ~ Carols ~ Together When...
 Aria
 Humming 7/4
 Bold & Delicious
 Mirrorcle World
 Seven Days WAR
 Evolution
 Boys & Girls
 Dream On

Encore
 Love Song
 Virgin Road
 Moon
 Trauma ~ Audience ~ Fly high
 Flower Garden
 Thank U
 Do It Again

Total reported sales
31,844

Oricon week ranks
1st week: #1, 2nd week: #1, 3rd week: #5

References

Ayumi Hamasaki video albums
Live video albums
Albums recorded at the Yoyogi National Gymnasium